Colonel Josiah Snelling (1782 – 20 August 1828) was the first commander of Fort Snelling, a fort located at the confluence of the Mississippi and Minnesota rivers in Minnesota.  He was responsible for the initial design and construction of the fort, and he commanded it from 1820 through 1827.  He had a reputation for being tough and fair-minded, but also had a mean temper when he was drunk.  His second wife, Abigail Hunt Snelling, extended hospitality to visitors to the fort.  She also founded a Sunday School for the fort's children and assisted families from the Red River Colony (the Selkirk Settlement).

Lieutenant Colonel Henry Leavenworth was originally chosen to locate the fortification at the mouth of the St. Peter's River (the prior name of the Minnesota River) in 1819.  His expedition started out in Green Bay, Wisconsin, in May 1819, ascending the Fox River, then portaging to the Wisconsin River and following it downstream to its confluence with the Mississippi River at Prairie du Chien, Wisconsin.  He remained at Fort Crawford with his soldiers until supplies arrived in August, 1819, and then the expedition traveled upriver to the confluence with the St. Peter's River.  His soldiers originally built a winter settlement, known as Cantonment New Hope, two miles (3 km) up the St. Peter's River from the confluence.  The next spring, in anticipation of flooding, he moved the troops to higher ground at a site known as Camp Coldwater, a mile up the Mississippi from the confluence of the rivers.  Leavenworth was later relieved of his duty in August 1820 and succeeded by Colonel Josiah Snelling.

Two Minnesota streets, one in Minneapolis (Snelling Avenue), the other in Saint Paul (Snelling Avenue), in Minnesota's capital city, are named after him.

Life and career
Snelling, born in 1782, was the son of a well-to-do Boston baker. He married Elizabeth Bell and fathered a son, William Joseph Snelling, in 1804; his wife died in 1810. He joined the army in May 1808 and was recognized for his performance at the Battle of Tippecanoe. He was assigned to command Fort Harrison during the winter of 1811–12. on the Wabash River at the present site of Terre Haute, Indiana. During the War of 1812, he was promoted to Major and sent to Fort Detroit, where he met and married Abigail Hunt. They had 5 children, Mary, Henry Hunt Snelling, James, Marion, and Josiah. After the size of the army was reduced in 1815, Snelling spent about four years on the northern border of New York. In June 1819, Snelling was promoted to Colonel of the 5th Infantry Regiment and sent to oversee the construction of Fort St. Anthony. Snelling was concerned about the unhealthy living conditions of the temporary quarters at Cantonment New Hope on the St. Peter's River.  He traveled upriver from St. Louis and arrived at the cantonment on September 5, 1820, and immediately started the relocation and design of the new fort. 

Colonel Snelling located the fort on a bluff above the river junction, and with the aid of Lieutenant Robert McCabe, designed the fort as an elongated diamond.  The western point of the diamond had a large round tower, about thirty feet high and thirty feet in diameter, with musket ports in the sides and a cannon on the top.  The eastern point of the diamond was designed with a half-moon battery.  Two smaller batteries on the north and south sides were built for infantry and cannon.  Eight interior buildings of the fort were built from locally quarried limestone, while two other buildings were built from white pine, cut from around the Rum River area.  The fort had no formal architect.  All of the manpower of designing and building the fort came from Snelling's own troops.

The heavy limestone walls of the fort were constructed on a scale beyond many other frontier fortifications, suggesting America's intentions toward westward expansion.  Major General Brown had the opinion that a frontier fort of this nature should be built for permanency and independence since the distance from any other military posts would make assistance difficult to obtain if any battles would break out.  On the other hand, the idea of a large, permanent fortress to rule over the entire territory may have been overkill, since the usual pattern of westward expansion was to build temporary fortresses ahead of the line of settlement, shifting soldiers along the way.

The Army, recognizing the importance of fresh fruit and vegetables in a soldier's diet, made post commanders responsible for establishing gardens. Over the next few years, construction of the fort and cultivation of the gardens took priority over military duties. Snelling recognized that the fort should strive toward self-sufficiency, especially since the government stopped paying for seed in 1821 and since the government often delivered spoiled food or starving cattle. Snelling established a grist mill at Saint Anthony Falls to grind the wheat into flour, using millstones from St. Louis. About 100 barrels of flour were produced in 1823.

In order to deal peacefully with Native Americans in the vicinity of the fort, Snelling partnered with Indian Agent Lawrence Taliaferro. Taliaferro built a council house west of the fort in 1823, and was able to exert his influence by carefully distributing supplies such as food, gunpowder, tobacco, and whiskey to Native Americans.  Taliaferro's cooperation with the Native Americans ensured good relations and helped to avert open hostilities between the Ojibwe and the Sioux.

In spite of the Northwest Ordinance of 1787 and the Missouri Compromise of 1820 which outlawed slavery in the area, Colonel Snelling, Taliaferro, and others at the fort illegally employed slave labor. Snelling rented the labor of an enslaved man named William from Taliaferro, and purchased two enslaved women named Mary and Louisa. While enslaved at Fort Snelling, Harriet Robinson Scott married Dred Scott, in a ceremony officiated by Taliaferro that would later give credence to the Scotts' suite for freedom.

Colonel Snelling's health began to decline in early 1826, and the prescribed treatment of opium and brandy accelerated his alcoholism.  He left the fort in October 1827 and died in Washington, D.C., the following summer.

Papers

Papers of Josiah Snelling are available for research use.  They include photocopied letters written by Josiah Snelling, military commissions and related documents from his service in the Massachusetts militia (1803-1808) and the United States infantry (1808-1820), documents relating to the Connecticut state militia during the Revolutionary War, and a journal kept by Colonel Snelling as commandant at Fort Snelling

References

 
 Reichardt, Mary R. (1999). "SNELLING, William Joseph", American National Biography, Vol. 10. New York: Oxford University Press. .

External links 
 Josiah Snelling in MNopedia, the Minnesota Encyclopedia

1782 births
People of pre-statehood Minnesota
1828 deaths